St Owen's Church was a church and parish within the City of Gloucester in Gloucestershire, England. The parish church of St Owen's was situated on Southgate Street, just outside the South Gate of the formerly walled city, and was founded before 1100, but was demolished by the City Corporation in 1643, during the Civil War in advance of the Siege of Gloucester.

Position
In 1730 the Southgate Congregational Church was built on the site, and by 2010 the site was again vacant and was being used as a car park.

History
It was probably founded late in the 11th century, by Roger de Gloucester, who provided two chaplains for it.

References

Churches in Gloucester